Vingis Park is the largest park in Vilnius, Lithuania, covering . It is located in Vilkpėdė eldership near a curve of the Neris River, hence its Lithuanian name "vingis" which means "bend" or "curve". A pedestrian bridge connects the park with Žvėrynas. It is used as a venue for various events, especially concerts and sports competitions. It contains a stadium, an amphitheater and a department of the Botanical Garden of Vilnius University.

History
The park's history dates back several centuries.

Palace in Zakret

Vingis has also a historical Polish name of the location: Zakręt (with the same meaning). It was the site of a Palace in Zakret, that eventually was bought by the Local Russian governor general of Vilna Governorate, Levin August von Bennigsen in 1801. Prior to his purchase, it was a Jesuit palace built on a design by Johann Christoph Glaubitz.

Bennigsen's palace in Zakret is where, during a ball that took place on the night of 24/25 June 1812, Tzar Alexander I of Russia received the first news about the French invasion of Russia by the Grand Army of Napoleon Bonaparte. As Vilnius was close to the frontier where the invasion took place Alexander and his entourage left the area in a hurry. This event was immortalised in Tolstoy's account of it in War and Peace (Book 9 Chapter 3).

Later that year during the invasion the palace was used as a French military hospital, until it caught fire and was badly damaged. After the war it was not renovated and in 1855 the remains were demolished.

Redevelopment as an amphitheater
In 1965, the park was redeveloped and adopted to the needs of mass events, such as concerts or political rallies. The amphitheater was built using a modified design of the Estonian Song Festival Grounds in Tallinn. Several major rallies and demonstrations were held there during the course of the Lithuanian independence movement of the late 1980s; a rally on August 23, 1988 drew 250,000 people.

Events 
Many celebrities have performed their shows at this venue, including Andrea Bocelli, Elton John, Björk, Sting, Rod Stewart, Depeche Mode, and famous Lithuanian music groups like Foje, Antis. The record of most attendants was in 1997, when Foje performed their last concert - over 60,000 fans were there.

Lady Gaga has performed at this venue for her first concert in a Baltic country on August 21, 2012 at Vingis Park in Vilnius as a part of her The Born This Way Ball Tour in front of 14,853 people.

On November 7, 2016, Robbie Williams announced that he will be performing at the venue on August 16, 2017.

German band Rammstein has announced the start of their European Stadium Tour there on the 22th of May 2023.

Sports 
 , seen on the map of the park (a.k.a. Vilnius Gintaras Stadium, to distinguish from the older, but abandoned ) formerly belonging to the sports club Gintaras
 Vingis Park Rugby Stadium
 Archery field
 Tennis court
 Basketball court

Notes and references

External links
 Official website

Parks in Vilnius